This page lists the women's qualification results of the 2013 World Artistic Gymnastics Championships.

Total qualified by country

Individual all-around

Vault

Uneven bars

Balance beam

Floor exercise

References
 

2013 World Artistic Gymnastics Championships
2013 in women's gymnastics